Leon Clay Berry (July 2, 1914 - August 23, 1996) was an American organist. He was known in Chicago as the "dean of roller rink rock". A graduate of the American Conservatory of Music, his 1953 recording "Misirlou" on Dot Records charted sixth on the Billboard Magazine popularity charts.

Berry also recorded his music for Audio Fidelity Records.

References

External links
 Leon Berry remembrance page

1914 births
1996 deaths
American male organists
Audio Fidelity Records artists
20th-century American musicians
Dot Records artists
20th-century organists
20th-century American male musicians
American organists
People from Dallas County, Alabama